Dolphin Design is a semiconductor design company, founded in 2018 following its acquisition by Soitec. Formerly knows as Dolphin Integration, it is based in Meylan in the Grenoble region.

History 

Dolphin Design is a semiconductor design company, created in 2018 after Dolphin Integration was acquired by Soitec. Dolphin Design is based in Meylan in the Grenoble region. It also has R&D offices in Laval, Canada and Singapore.

Dolphin Integration as it was formerly know, is a semiconductor design company, established in 1985, with the mission of developing complex analog, digital and miwed-signal IPs for design companies.

The catalog initially included libraries of standard cells and embedded memory generators, converter for measurement and high resolution audio processing, low power IPs, EDA solutions which included a mixed signal simulator (SMASH).

Since then, the catalog has evolved to include IPs for ultra-low power management, audio, MCU sub-system, AI/ML accelerator and DSPs.

On July 24, 2018, the assets of Dolphin Design were acquired over by a joint-venture created by Soitec and MBDA.

On July 16, 2019, Dolphin Integration was placed in receivership.

As of 2022, the company employs 170 people. Its turnover as of December 31, 2021 is : €21 942 000.

Activities 
Dolphin Design develops analog, digital and mixed-signal IPs and platforms in the area of audio, ultra-low power, AI/ML and processing.

In 2020, Dolphin Design received the Solar Impulse Label, and in 2022 it received the Embedded World Award in the startup category for its AI/ML accelerator (TinyRaptor). This product was developing following a three-year collaboration with the CEA Grenoble (List Laboratory).

It proposes a range of products using different technologies: Machine Learning, Digital Signal Processor, ASIC, Neural Processor Unit, Voltage Regulator, Edge Computing, wearables and automotive.

Market and competition 
The semiconductor market has been growing rapidly since the 1970s. The growth has accelerated in the last few decades especially in the areas of IoT, Edge Computing, wearables and automotive.

It collaborates with foundries companies such as: TSMC, Global Foundries, SMIC, Samsung, to develop its products.

Time line

Name
Half of their name comes from the Dolphin, referring to the French province where lies its headquarters, the Dauphiné.  Their logo is a dolphin jumping with the shape of an integral symbol. It jumps over the pad-ring of an integrated circuit, which yields the other half of their name.

1985
Founding of Dolphin Integration in 1985 with a dedication to design services to the Integrated Device Makers (IDM) in the wake of deverticalization of this industry.

1986
COOPEREL prize from then FIEE, now FIEEC as the French Federation of Electrical, Electronics and Communication Industries.

1987
Partnership with the French military procurement at Direction générale de l'armement (DGA) for dual high-tech (with civil applications).

1991
Microelectronic trophy from EUROASIC for a joint project with Roland Moreno, the inventor of the Smart card.

1995
Launch of Dolphin's first Virtual Component of Silicon IP sold to Fabless IC suppliers at the time of emergence of TSMC as the first foundry.

First foray into Asian markets started in Japan.

1997
First-ever conference-exposition for the nascent IP business with “IP-97” in Santa Clara.

Market entry into Taiwan.

1999
Acquisition of the first working virtual components (i8051) from Richard Watts Associates who had designed it for the Music Synthesizer of Evolution Ltd (Shenzhen).

2002
First contract signed with Chinese customer in Shanghai at the first Design Automation Conference.

2003
Stock exchange listing on the French Over-the-counter market (MLDOL)

2004
Fall-out from DGA-funded innovation in an essential integrated circuit for the Airbus A380

2007
Funding of Dolphin Integration Inc. in Montreal, Quebec, Canada for the development of power regulators.

Reward at the tenth edition of Innovation Trophy, organized by the French National Industrial Property Institute

Trophy of the “best service partner” in microelectronic design for the twentieth anniversary of STMicroelectronics

Transfer of stock-listing to the Alternext market (ALDOL)

2008
Certification ISO 9001:2008

Funding of Dolphin Integration Ltd. in Netanya, Israel for the development of Register files

2010
3 partnership agreements with TSMC for audio codecs at 40, 55 and 65 nm.

First sale in Korea of high-resolution measurement converters for Smart grid applications

2011
First partnership with TSMC for developing a sponsored library offering

“TSMC IP partner award” for analog/mixed-signal IP for high SNR audio converters

2012
First contract with a European defense manufacturer, resulting from a collaborative project funded by the European Defense Agency (EDA SoC)

2013
Renewal of the “innovative company” qualification by the BPI-France (the French Public Investment Bank)

2014
Dolphin Integration receives TSMC's Open Innovation Platform® 2014 Partner of the Year Award for Specialty IP

2015
Dolphin Integration receives TSMC's Open Innovation Platform® 2015 Partner of the Year Award for Specialty IP

2018 
Dolphin Integration enters a new era following the appointment of Christian Dupont as CEO of the company.

Dolphin Integration enters bankruptcy proceedings 
https://www.dolphin-integration.com/index.php/investors/news/448

Dolphin Integration has been acquired by Soitec (60%) and MBDA (40%) for a total amount of 5 M€

2019
Philippe Berger was appointed as new CEO 

Dolphin Integration becomes Dolphin Design.

2020
Silvaco acquired the memory compiler technologies and standard cell libraries of Dolphin Design.

References

External links 
 The Dolphin Integration website

Software companies of France
Electronic design automation